Hieronim Stroynowski (20 September 1752 – 5 August 1815) was a Polish bishop and economist. He was the rector of Vilnius University from 1799 to 1806 and the Bishop of Vilnius from 1814 until his death in 1815. His writings on economics contributed to Polish liberalism.

Biography 
Stroynowski began study with the Piarists in 1760 and took his vows in 1768. He taught at the Collegium Nobilium in Warsaw between 1774 and 1778 before moving to Vilnius to teach at Vilnius University, where he would become a Freemason and continue to teach until 1809. In 1782, he received his doctorate in theology from Jagiellonian University. Between 1787 and 1788 he took a sabbatical in Italy. He became the rector of Vilnius University in 1799 until resigning in 1806.

Economic ideas 
Stroynowski wrote a handbook of political and economic studies for the Commission of National Education which would help establish Polish liberalism and physiocracy in Poland. It advocated personal freedom, private property, the sanctity of contract, and free trade. He considered property rights to be the foundation of politics and morality. He also advocated natural law, which he defined as "a collection of foremost and immutable principles, or innate laws, according to which all humanity, everywhere and always, should conform".

Notable works 

  (The Study of Natural and Political Law, Economics and the Law of Nations, 1785)

References 

1752 births
1815 deaths
19th-century Roman Catholic bishops in Lithuania
Bishops of Vilnius
Jagiellonian University alumni
Polish economists
Academic staff of Vilnius University
Rectors of Vilnius University